Muhannad Saif El-Din (born 11 September 1980) is an Egyptian fencer. He competed in the épée events at the 2000 and 2004 Summer Olympics.

References

External links
 

1980 births
Living people
Egyptian male épée fencers
Olympic fencers of Egypt
Fencers at the 2000 Summer Olympics
Fencers at the 2004 Summer Olympics
20th-century Egyptian people
21st-century Egyptian people